Adelina González Muñoz (born 6 August 1964) is a former Spanish female sailor. She competed at the 1988 Summer Olympics representing Spain in the Women's 470 event.

References

External links
 
 

1964 births
Living people
Spanish female sailors (sport)
Olympic sailors of Spain
Sailors at the 1988 Summer Olympics – 470